Old school, also called American traditional or Western traditional, is a tattoo style featuring bold black outlines and a limited color palette, with common motifs influenced by sailor tattoos. Many common flash designs are in this style. This style influenced new school tattoos, which use a wider range of colors, shading, and subjects.

Artists
 Norman Keith Collins, also known as Sailor Jerry, (1911–1973) was one of the most well-known traditional tattoo artists.
 Herbert Hoffmann (1919–2010), began tattooing in Germany during the 1930s. Together with fellow artists Karlmann Richter and Albert Cornelissen, he was featured in the 2004 film Blue Skin (German: Flammend' Herz).
 Amund Dietzel (1890–1974), Norwegian-born artist who began his career as a sailor, before settling in the United States. Known as the "Master in Milwaukee".
 Bert Grimm (1900–1985). Began his career in the city of St. Louis and then moved to Long Beach, California, to set up a shop at the Nu-Pike.  His parlour was said to be the oldest continually running in the continental US and the place for sailors to get inked.  Grimm sold the shop to Bob Shaw in 1970.
 Bob Shaw (1926–1993), American artist who learned tattooing from Bert Grimm in St. Louis. Later worked with Grimm and became the president of the National Tattoo Association from 1983–1988.

Common motifs 

Many old school motifs derive from tattoos popular among military service members, including patriotic symbols, such as eagles and American flags, along with pin-up girls.

Other old school tattoo designs include:

 Mermaid
 Swallow (sometimes confused with sparrows and bluebirds)
 Heart
 Anchor
 Eagle
 Panther
 Snake
 Luck (black cats, 13, four-leaf clover, horseshoe, etc.)
 Navy and sailing symbols
 Dagger
 Rose
 Nautical star

Examples 
Designs circa 1900–1945 by Clark & Sellers:

References

External links
Old School tattoo gallery on BME zine

Tattooing traditions